The BRÜSSEL was an early German, steam locomotive.  It was used by the Leipzig–Dresden Railway Company (LDE) for hauling passenger trains.

The locomotive was delivered to the LDE in 1842 by Renard of Brussels in Belgium with works number 11. It was retired between 1859 and 1861.

See also 
 Royal Saxon State Railways
 List of Saxon locomotives and railbuses
 Leipzig–Dresden Railway Company

References 

 
 

2-2-2 locomotives
Locomotives of Saxony
Railway locomotives introduced in 1842
Standard gauge locomotives of Germany
Passenger locomotives